Wang Bo (born 3 April 1970) is a Chinese former football player and football manager. He is currently the interim manager of Chinese Super League side Beijing Renhe.

Managerial statistics

References

1970 births
Living people
Chinese football managers